is a Japanese professional boxer who currently competes in the minimumweight division. He is a former OPBF minimumweight champion.

Early life
Ryuji Hara was born in Itō, Shizuoka on July 10, 1990. He initially wanted to be a jockey, and even passed the strict test. However, after winning the National High School Boxing Championship (his first of four), he decided to focus on boxing. His amateur record was 36-2 (16 KO).

Professional career
Hara made his professional debut in 2010, and won the All-Japan Minimumweight Rookie Tournament in November.
After an impressive 12–0 start to his career, Hara received a shot at the vacant Japanese minimumweight title. He defeated veteran fighter Kenichi Horikawa by unanimous decision on October 2, 2012, in Tokyo for the belt.

After three successful defenses, Hara defeated Donny Mabao for the vacant OPBF minimumweight title on March 30, 2014, in Fuji by majority decision.

By this time, he was ranked in the top four by all four major boxing organizations (#2 WBA, #2 WBO, #4 WBC, #5 IBF). Instead of waiting for a world title match, Hara make the risky decision to defend his OPBF belt against up-and-coming fighter Kosei Tanaka on October 30, 2014, in Tokyo. Tanaka won by 10th-round TKO.

After an easy second-round knockout against Thai fighter Petchnamchai Sor Sakulwong, Hara was given a shot at the IBF World minimumweight champion, Katsunari Takayama, on September 27, 2015. During the fight, Takayama suffered a cut above his left eye in round three, but eventually overwhelmed Hara with power shots to the body and head. Referee Wayne Hedgepeth stopped the fight in the eighth round to give Takayama the victory.

Professional boxing record

| style="text-align:center;" colspan="8"|23 Wins (14 knockouts, 7 decisions),  2 Losses (2 knockouts, 0 decisions), 0 Draws
|-  style="text-align:center; background:#e3e3e3;"
|  style="border-style:none none solid solid; "|Res.
|  style="border-style:none none solid solid; "|Record
|  style="border-style:none none solid solid; "|Opponent
|  style="border-style:none none solid solid; "|Type
|  style="border-style:none none solid solid; "|Rd., Time
|  style="border-style:none none solid solid; "|Date
|  style="border-style:none none solid solid; "|Location
|  style="border-style:none none solid solid; "|Notes
|- align=center
|Win
|align=center|23–2||align=left| Seneey Worachina
|
|
|
|align=left|
|align=left|
|- align=center
|Win
|align=center|22–2||align=left| Akiyoshi Kanazawa
|
|
|
|align=left|
|align=left|
|- align=center
|Win
|align=center|21–2||align=left| Hiroya Yamamoto
|
|
|
|align=left|
|align=left|
|- align=center
|Win
|align=center|20–2||align=left| Takashi Omae
|
|
|
|align=left|
|align=left|
|- align=center
|Loss
|align=center|19–2||align=left| Katsunari Takayama
|
|
|
|align=left|
|align=left|
|- align=center
|Win
|align=center|19–1||align=left| Petchnamchai Sor Sakulwong
|
|
|
|align=left|
|align=left|
|- align=center
|Loss
|align=center|18–1||align=left| Kosei Tanaka
|
|
|
|align=left|
|align=left|
|- align=center
|Win
|align=center|18–0||align=left| Faris Nenggo
|
|
|
|align=left|
|align=left|
|- align=center
|Win
|align=center|17–0||align=left| Donny Mabao
|
|
|
|align=left|
|align=left|
|- align=center
|Win
|align=center|16–0||align=left| Takashi Kunishige
|
|
|
|align=left|
|align=left|
|- align=center
|Win
|align=center|15–0||align=left| Shuhei Ito
|
|
|
|align=left|
|align=left|
|- align=center
|Win
|align=center|14–0||align=left| Yuma Iwahashi
|
|
|
|align=left|
|align=left|
|- align=center
|Win
|align=center|13–0||align=left| Kenichi Horikawa
|
|
|
|align=left|
|align=left|
|- align=center
|Win
|align=center|12–0||align=left| Kaokarat Kaolernlekgym
|
|
|
|align=left|
|align=left|
|- align=center
|Win
|align=center|11–0||align=left| Yokthong KKP
|
|
|
|align=left|
|align=left|
|- align=center
|Win
|align=center|10–0||align=left| Louis Loemoli
|
|
|
|align=left|
|align=left|
|- align=center
|Win
|align=center|9–0||align=left| Athiwatlek Chaiyonggym
|
|
|
|align=left|
|align=left|
|- align=center
|Win
|align=center|8–0||align=left| Hiroshi Ishii
|
|
|
|align=left|
|align=left|
|- align=center
|Win
|align=center|7–0||align=left| Yodchingchai Sithkonnapha
|
|
|
|align=left|
|align=left|
|- align=center
|Win
|align=center|6–0||align=left| Nuclear Sor Tanapinyo
|
|
|
|align=left|
|align=left|
|- align=center
|Win
|align=center|5–0||align=left| Shuhei Ito
|
|
|
|align=left|
|align=left|
|- align=center
|Win
|align=center|4–0||align=left| Ken Agena
|
|
|
|align=left|
|align=left|
|- align=center
|Win
|align=center|3–0||align=left| Go Odaira
|
|
|
|align=left|
|align=left|
|- align=center
|Win
|align=center|2–0||align=left| Kenta Kosuge
|
|
|
|align=left|
|align=left|
|- align=center
|Win
|align=center|1–0|| align=left| Wittaya Sithsaithong
|
|
|
|align=left|
|align=left|

References

External links
 
 Ryuji Hara on AsianBoxing

1990 births
Living people
Japanese male boxers
Mini-flyweight boxers
Light-flyweight boxers
Sportspeople from Shizuoka Prefecture